Ella Ndatega Kamanya (9 November 1961 – 31 July 2005) was a Namibian politician and businesswoman. She joined the South West Africa People's Organization (SWAPO) in exile in 1978 and survived the Battle of Cassinga by the South African Army. 

Kamaya was appointed to the National Assembly of Namibia in 2003, replacing Hage Geingob. In March 2004, Kamanya was appointed to the Pan-African Parliament.

Early life 
Kamanya was born on 9 November 1961 in Onangalo, Uukwaluudhi Kingdom, Ovamboland. Her father was a prominent local politician and businessperson. She grew up in a devoutly Christian family.

Career 
In 1978, she joined SWAPO in exile and, shortly after arriving in Cassinga, Angola, the encampment she and other Namibian exiles and refugees were based in was raided by the South African Defence Force. She was captured during the May 1978 Battle of Cassinga, returned to South-West Africa, and subsequently incarcerated in Oshakati.

A businesswoman by profession, Kamanya ran movie theaters in Ongwediva and Ondangwa before joining the National Assembly. She requested to be buried in northern Namibia.

Controversy 
In March 2004, Kamanya faced criticism for alleged graft in deals related to Black Economic Empowerment transactions and the San community of Namibia. She denied the allegations and died in July 2005.

References

1961 births
2005 deaths
People from Omusati Region
Members of the Pan-African Parliament from Namibia
Members of the National Assembly (Namibia)
Women members of the National Assembly (Namibia)
Namibian women in business
Namibian businesspeople
SWAPO politicians
Namibian expatriates in Angola
Prisoners and detainees of South Africa
Namibian people imprisoned abroad
Namibian exiles
Women members of the Pan-African Parliament